The Brennan Family Restaurants are a group of restaurants owned or operated by family members of the late Owen Brennan of New Orleans, Louisiana.

In the 1970s, there was a Brennan's Restaurant in Atlanta, Georgia.

Locations By City

New Orleans 
 Bacco (searching for new location)
 Brennan's - reopened in 2014
 Cafe Adelaide
 Cafe B
 Cafe NOMA
 Commander's Palace
 Dickie Brennan's Bourbon House Seafood
 Dickie Brennan's Steakhouse
 Dickie Brennan's Tableau - see Le Petit Theatre du Vieux Carre
 Heritage Grill
 Mr. B's Bistro
Napoleon House
 Palace Cafe
 Ralph's on the Park
 Red Fish Grill
 SoBou

Houston 
 Brennan's of Houston, Texas. Owned by founder-president, Alex Brennan-Martin.  Destroyed in a fire caused by a transformer as Hurricane Ike approached Houston on the night of September 12, 2008.  Reopened on Fat Tuesday, 2010.

Memphis 
 Owen Brennan's  is a family-owned and operated restaurant much like the original Brennan's.  However, the Brennan family does not own the restaurant.  Owen Brennan's is a licensee of Brennan's in New Orleans.  Owen Brennan's opened its doors to customers in 1990 under a partnership of investors.  Burt Wolf was the general partner.  In 1991, James (Jim) Austin Baker, Jr., became the general partner.  Jim later bought out all of the investors with his son, James Austin Baker III under BakCO LLC.
In 1993, John Grisham's book-to-movie, "The Firm" featured Owen Brennan's in a business lunch meeting between Tom Cruise & Gene Hackman in cocktail area of the restaurant. Owen Brennan's commemorated the filming by placing plaques on the two cocktail chairs where Tom Cruise and Gene Hackman sat.

Disneyland (Anaheim, California) 
 Ralph Brennan's Jazz Kitchen

Destin, Florida 
 Clark & Blake Brennan's Royal B Restaurant.  This location has since closed as of August 2008.
 Commander's Palace  - This location closed as of November 30, 2010.

Las Vegas 
 A Commander's Palace was opened in the mall at the Aladdin.

References

External links 
Brennan's
Brennan's of Houston

Restaurants in New Orleans